The Yamaha YM2154, also known as RYP4 (Rhythm Processor), is an audio microchip that was produced by the Yamaha Corporation. It been used for keyboards and drum machines. It has twelve individual samples and also an ADPCM Rompler and a ten channel Analog-to-digital converter.

Products
The chip was used in (1985) for the Porta Tone PSR-60, PSR-70 and PSR-80. It was also used in the RX-11 and RX-15 drum machines.

References

Yamaha sound chips